Gerd Kanter (born 6 May 1979) is a retired Estonian discus thrower. He was the 2007 World Champion in the event and won the gold medal at the 2008 Summer Olympics, and bronze in London 2012. His personal best throw of 73.38 m is the Estonian record and the third best mark of all-time.

He made his first Olympic appearance in 2004 and established himself a year later by taking the silver medal at the 2005 World Championships. He was runner-up at the 2006 European Athletics Championships and won further medals at the World Championships in 2009 (bronze) and 2011 (silver).

He won the 2012 and the 2013 IAAF Diamond League in discus throw.

Career
He competed at the 2004 Olympics, but did not reach the final. The season 2005 was his breakthrough year as he won silver medals at the World Championships and World Athletics Final, took home a victory in the European Cup and won the World University Games. He also threw more than 70 metres for the first time.

On 4 September 2006 in Helsingborg, Sweden, Kanter threw more than 70 metres in four different rounds (69.46 – 72.30 – 70.43 – 73.38 – 70.51 – 65.88). The best mark of 73.38 m was an Estonian record and the third best in history – only Jürgen Schult (74.08 m, 1986) and Virgilijus Alekna (73.88 m, 2000) have thrown further.

Kanter was the silver medalist at the 2006 European Athletics Championships, finishing behind Virgilijus Alekna, and became the world champion in the discus at the 2007 World Championships in Athletics in Osaka. At the 2008 Beijing Olympics, he took the Olympic gold medal with a throw of 68.82 meters, one meter ahead of second-place finisher Piotr Malachowski of Poland.

In March 2009 he won the European Cup Winter Throwing event in Los Realejos, Tenerife, Spain with 69.70 m. On 22 March 2009, he set a world indoor best of 69.51 m in Växjö, Sweden. At the 2009 World Championships in Athletics he returned to defend his world title. He had a best throw of 66.88 m, which was enough for the World bronze medal. He took victory in the Wexiö Indoor Throwing competition in 2010, although his winning throw was some way behind his indoor record set the previous year. Still, he started strongly outdoors, having a long early-season throw of 71.45 m in California – the eleventh best throw ever at that point.

He finished just outside the medals at the 2010 European Athletics Championships, coming fourth, but managed to win the silver medal at the 2011 World Championships in Athletics behind Robert Harting. He ended that year with a season's best throw of 67.99 m at the Kamila Skolimowska Memorial.

He retired from competition after the 2018 season.

Achievements

Honours
Estonian Sportsman of the Year: 2007, 2008, 2011
European Athlete of the Month: April 2009, April 2010, September 2014

Orders
 Order of the Estonian Red Cross, 1st Class: 2009
 Order of the White Star, 4th Class: 2006

References

External links

 
 
 
 
 
NBC Olympics – Athlete profile
Gerd Kanter official page
Gerd Kanter page

1979 births
Living people
Athletes from Tallinn
Estonian male discus throwers
Athletes (track and field) at the 2004 Summer Olympics
Athletes (track and field) at the 2008 Summer Olympics
Athletes (track and field) at the 2012 Summer Olympics
Athletes (track and field) at the 2016 Summer Olympics
Olympic athletes of Estonia
Olympic gold medalists for Estonia
Olympic bronze medalists for Estonia
World Athletics Championships medalists
European Athletics Championships medalists
Medalists at the 2012 Summer Olympics
Medalists at the 2008 Summer Olympics
World Athletics Championships athletes for Estonia
Olympic gold medalists in athletics (track and field)
Olympic bronze medalists in athletics (track and field)
Universiade medalists in athletics (track and field)
Olympic male discus throwers
Universiade gold medalists for Estonia
Recipients of the Order of the White Star, 1st Class
Recipients of the Order of the White Star, 4th Class
Diamond League winners
IAAF Continental Cup winners
World Athletics Championships winners
Medalists at the 2005 Summer Universiade